California's 21st congressional district (or CA-21) is a congressional district in the U.S. state of California. It is located in the San Joaquin Valley and includes parts of Fresno County and Tulare County. Cities in the district include the majority of Fresno, the north side of Visalia, and all of Sanger, Selma, Kingsburg, Parlier, Reedley, Orange Cove, Dinuba, Orosi, Cutler, Farmersville, Woodlake and Exeter. The district is currently represented by Democrat Jim Costa.

Demographics 
According to the APM Research Lab's Voter Profile Tools (featuring the U.S. Census Bureau's 2019 American Community Survey), the district contained about 377,000 potential voters (citizens, age 18+). Of these, 63% are Latino, while 26% are White. Immigrants make up 16% of the district's potential voters. Median income among households (with one or more potential voter) in the district is about $51,500, while 15% of households live below the poverty line. As for the educational attainment of potential voters in the district, 23% of those 25 and older have not earned a high school degree, while 12% hold a bachelor's or higher degree.

Election results from statewide races

List of members representing the district

Election results

1942

1944

1946

1948

1950

1952

1954

1956

1958

1960

1962

1964

1966

1968

1970

1972

1974

1976

1978

1980

1982

1984

1986

1988

1990

1992

1994

1996

1998

2000

2002

2004

2006

2008

2010

2012

2014

2016

2018

2020

See also
 List of United States congressional districts

References

External links
 GovTrack.us: California's 21st congressional district
 RAND California Election Returns: District Definitions
 California Voter Foundation map - CD21

21
Government of Fresno County, California
Government of Kern County, California
Government of Kings County, California
Government of Tulare County, California
Coalinga, California
Corcoran, California
Hanford, California
Lemoore, California
San Joaquin Valley
Constituencies established in 1943
1943 establishments in California